Aslauga kallimoides, the imitating aslauga, is a butterfly in the family Lycaenidae. It is found in southern Cameroon, the Republic of the Congo and the Democratic Republic of the Congo (Equateur).

References

External links
Die Gross-Schmetterlinge der Erde 13: Die Afrikanischen Tagfalter. Plate XIII 65 c
Images representing Aslauga kallimoides at Barcodes of Life

Butterflies described in 1912
Aslauga